Tammy Ma is an American plasma physicist who works on inertial confinement fusion at the Lawrence Livermore National Laboratory.

Education and career
Ma studied aerospace engineering at the California Institute of Technology, graduating in 2005. She went to the University of California, San Diego for graduate study, earning a master's degree in 2008 and completing her Ph.D. in 2010.

After postdoctoral research at the Lawrence Livermore National Laboratory, she joined the laboratory as a staff scientist in 2012.

Recognition
Ma was a recipient of the Presidential Early Career Award for Scientists and Engineers, in 2013. She was the 2016 winner of the Thomas H. Stix Award for Outstanding Early Career Contributions to Plasma Physics Research of the American Physical Society (APS), "for innovation and leadership in quantifying hydrodynamic instability mix in inertial confinement fusion implosions at the National Ignition Facility and for key contributions to experiments demonstrating fusion fuel gains exceeding unity". In 2021, she won the Excellence in Fusion Engineering Award of the Fusion Power Associates, and was named a Fellow of the American Physical Society, after a nomination from the APS Division of Plasma Physics, "for outstanding scientific contributions and leadership in the field of intense laser-matter interactions and inertial fusion energy science".

References

External links

Year of birth missing (living people)
Living people
American plasma physicists
American women physicists
California Institute of Technology alumni
University of California, San Diego alumni
Lawrence Livermore National Laboratory staff
Fellows of the American Physical Society
21st-century American physicists
21st-century American women scientists